David 'Jinksy' Beggy is an All-Ireland winning Gaelic footballer from County Meath.

Beggy -- who played with his club, Navan O'Mahonys -- won two All-Ireland Senior Football Championships in 1987 and 1988. He also received two all stars while playing for the Meath county team, as well as playing Rugby with Leinster. Having come from a rugby playing background, 'Jinksy' Beggy with no underage pedigree in GAA, burst onto the scene in the summer of 1986 and went on to become a huge favourite with the Meath supporters. David claims to have raced against a greyhound in Shelbourne Park for charity, and won. David ran half the track, while the greyhound ran the full track, his reasoning being the dog had four legs and he only has two. In 2007 RTÉ's Charity You're A Star, David teamed up with other former GAA All Stars, Jack O'Shea and Barney Rock to raise money for the 'Gary Kelly Cancer Support Center' and went on to win the show. David is still involved in Gaelic Football and is currently the manager of the senior football team at St Mary's GAA Club, Leixlip.

See also
 List of players who have converted from one football code to another

Sources
RTÉ entry
Hoganstand article

Year of birth missing (living people)
Living people
Gaelic football forwards
Gaelic footballers who switched code
Irish rugby union players
Leinster Rugby players
Meath inter-county Gaelic footballers
Navan O'Mahoneys Gaelic footballers
People educated at St Patrick's Classical School
Singing talent show winners
Winners of two All-Ireland medals (Gaelic football)
You're a Star contestants
Rugby union players from County Meath